Spurling is a surname. Notable people with the surname include:

James Spurling Albert or James S. Albert, professor of biology at the University of Louisiana at Lafayette
Andrew Barclay Spurling (1833–1906), officer in the Union Army during the American Civil War
Arthur Spurling, Bermudian who served during the First World War, becoming an ace credited with six aerial victories
Bell & Spurling, English comedy music duo, consisting of Martin Bell and Johnny Spurling
Bill Spurling (1907–1972), Australian rules footballer
Bob Spurling (born 1943), former Australian rules footballer
Chris Spurling (born 1977), former relief pitcher
Frederick Spurling (1844–1914), British Anglican priest, university academic and theological writer
Hilary Spurling, CBE, FRSL (born 1940), British writer, known for her work as a journalist and biographer
Jack Spurling (1870–1933), English painter of sailing ships
R. G. Spurling (1857–1935), founder of Church of God
Roy Glenwood Spurling (1894–1968), American neurosurgeon remembered for describing Spurling's test
Spurling sign or Spurling's test, medical manoeuvre used to assess nerve root pain
Scott Spurling (born 1993), English professional rugby union player

See also
Appleby Spurling Hunter, offshore legal service provider
J Spurling Ltd v Bradshaw, an English contract law and English property law case on exclusion clauses and bailment